Stefanie Martin, born Stefanie Oppenheim (10 July 1877 – ) was a German biological anthropologist.

Life
Stephanie L. Oppenheim was born to a Jewish family in Frankfurt on 10 July 1877.

Oppenheim married the Swiss anthropogist Rudolf Martin, becoming his second wife. After his death in 1925, she edited a revised edition (1928) of his textbook of physical anthropology.

In 1930 she was a contributor to Walter Scheidt's Rockefeller-funded anthropological study of the German population. 

Facing Nazi persecution, she was sent to Theresienstadt. According to some sources, she survived  Theresienstadt. However, other sources give her year of death as 1940.

Works
 Zur Typologie des Primatencraniums. Stuttgart: E. Schweizerbart, 1911.
 (ed.) Lehrbuch der Anthropologie in systematischer Darstellung [Textbook of Physical Anthropology in Systematic Presentation] by Rudolf Martin. 1928.

References

1877 births
1940 deaths
Year of death uncertain
German anthropologists
German women anthropologists